Kristian Alfred Hammer (14 June 1898 – 8 August 1965) was a Norwegian politician for the Liberal Party.

He served as a deputy representative to the Norwegian Parliament from Sør-Trøndelag during the term 1954–1957.

References

1898 births
1965 deaths
Liberal Party (Norway) politicians
Deputy members of the Storting